Middleburg Academy ( formerly Notre Dame Academy,  a girl's Catholic boarding school, until it went coed in the  1990's,  it then became a day school with an enrollment of approximately 150, until it was purchased by Middleburg Academy) Middleburg Academy was a co-educational, nonsectarian, independent secondary school,  set on a historic campus of more than  in Middleburg, Virginia.  On June 17, 2020 Middleburg Academy announced its full closure.

Background
Middleburg Academy was founded in 1965.  Originally a girls boarding school, in 1990 it became a co-educational day school.  In 2000, the school was purchased by the Board of Trustees and in 2009 became a fully independent, nonsectarian school.  It closed in June 2020.

Education and extracurriculars 

The school was open to students of all faiths who were seeking an independent, co-educational, college preparatory high school in the Northern Virginia area.  Of the twenty-seven full-time members of faculty, seventeen held one or more advanced degrees, with five holding PhDs.  Advanced placement (AP) courses were offered in all academic disciplines.

Students participated in a variety of clubs and organizations, such as Green Club, Spirit Club, Yearbook, Student Council, and the Varsity Club.  All students were required to have been accepted into one four-year accredited college, pass all classes in their senior year, and fulfill an annual mandatory twenty-five hour community service prerequisite in order to graduate.

Each student was assigned to an Advisory group, which was a group of ten to twelve students and one faculty member which met twice a week.  The faculty member acted as a liaison to parents for information about upcoming school activities and as a first point of contact when students needed guidance.

Athletics 
More than 90% of Middleburg Academy Students participated in athletics.  The school offered a variety of athletics, including basketball, field hockey, soccer, lacrosse, cross-country, baseball, golf, volleyball, swimming, and tennis teams.  There was a no-cut sports policy, allowing for all of the students to be a member of a sports team.

Notes and references

Private high schools in Virginia
Schools in Loudoun County, Virginia
Educational institutions established in 1965
1965 establishments in Virginia
Educational institutions disestablished in 2020
2020 disestablishments in Virginia